The Arab American Book Award, established in 2006, is an annual literary award to celebrate and support the research of, and the written work of, Arab Americans and their culture. The Arab American Book Award encourages the publication and excellence of books that preserve and advance the understanding, knowledge, and resources of the Arab American community by celebrating the thoughts and lives of Arab Americans. The purpose of the Award is to inspire authors, educate readers and foster a respect and understanding of the Arab American culture.

The Arab American Book Award was brought about by the Arab American National Museum and faculty members of the nearby University of Toledo. The winning titles are chosen by groups of selected readers including respected authors, university professors, artists and AANM staff. The Awards are given during an invitation only event in the Fall of the award year. The AANM first gave these awards in 2007 for books published in 2006; for 2007, the number of submissions more than doubled from the inaugural year.

To help ensure the continuity of the Arab American Book Award a special endowment fund has been launched with a $10,000 gift from Drs. A. Adnan and Barbara C. Aswad. Dr. Barbara C. Aswad is Professor Emerita of Anthropology at Wayne State University in Detroit, Michigan and a past president of the Middle Eastern Studies Association and a Board Member Emerita for the Arab Community Center for Economic and Social Services (ACCESS), parent organization of the Arab American National Museum. Dr. A. Adnan Aswad is Professor Emeritus of Engineering at the University of Michigan–Dearborn. The Aswads, now based in Los Angeles, were inspired to make the gift after the inaugural Book Award ceremony in Fall 2007.

In 2011, the non-fiction prize was renamed to honor the legacy and contributions to Arab American scholarship of Evelyn Shakir, who died of breast cancer in 2010. In addition to winning the Arab American Book Award for Fiction in 2008, Professor Shakir extensively researched the history of Arab women and wrote the groundbreaking work Bint Arab: Arab and Arab American Women in the United States in 1997. Evelyn's longtime partner, poet George Ellenbogen, established the award in collaboration with the Arab American National Museum.

Chronology change (2009) 

In 2009, The Arab American Book Award Committee changed the name of the '2008 Arab American Book Award' to the '2009 Arab American Book Award' in order to reflect the true award date instead of the publication date of the winning books. All dates in the previous Award years were also changed retroactively. While the date within the Award name has changed, the rules regarding the publication dates for eligible submissions have not.

Award recipients

Adult Fiction

Evelyn Shakir Non-Fiction Award
Prior to 2011, this award was referred to primarily as the Non-Fiction Award.

Children's/ Young Adult

George Ellenbogen Poetry Award

See also
List of Arab American writers

References

External links 
Arab American Book Award, Official Site
Arab American National Museum Website
ACCESS (Arab Community Center for Economic and Social Services)

Arab-American organizations
Arab-American literature
Awards established in 2006
American children's literary awards
Literary awards honoring minority groups
2006 establishments in the United States
American literary awards